Tomasz Piotr Tomiak (17 September 1967 – 21 August 2020) was a Polish rower. He was born in Nowy Tomyśl.

References 

 
 

1967 births
2020 deaths
Polish male rowers
Rowers at the 1992 Summer Olympics
Olympic bronze medalists for Poland
Olympic rowers of Poland
Olympic medalists in rowing
People from Nowy Tomyśl County
Sportspeople from Greater Poland Voivodeship
World Rowing Championships medalists for Poland
Medalists at the 1992 Summer Olympics